Kicking and Screaming may refer to:

Film and television
 Kicking and Screaming (1995 film), by Noah Baumbach, starring Josh Hamilton
 Kicking & Screaming (2005 film), starring Will Ferrell
 Kicking & Screaming (TV series), a 2017 reality series from Fox

Music

Albums
 Kicking & Screaming (Sebastian Bach album)
 Kickin' and Screamin', an album by rapper Krizz Kaliko

Songs
 "Kicking and Screaming" (song), a 2008 single by Funeral For A Friend
 "Kickin' and Screamin, a song by Garth Brooks on the album In Pieces
 "Kickin' and Screamin, a song by Marques Houston on the album Mattress Music
 Kicking & Screaming, a song by All Time Low on the album Future Hearts
 "Kicking and Screaming", a song by Ashlee Simpson on the album I Am Me, covered by Miley Cyrus for her EP The Time of Our Lives
 "Kicking and Screaming", a song by The Presets on the album Apocalypso